Matilda was a ship built in France and launched in 1779. She became a whaling ship for the British company Camden, Calvert and King, making a whaling voyage while under the command of Matthew Weatherhead to New South Wales and the Pacific in 1790.

She enters Lloyd's Register in 1791 with Weatherhead as master, Calvert & Co., as owners, and trade London—Botany Bay. That year, either owned or leased by Samuel Enderby & Sons, she transported convicts from England to Australia as part of the third fleet.

She departed Portsmouth on 27 March 1791 and arrived on 1 August in Port Jackson, New South Wales. She had embarked 250 male convicts in England, 25 of whom died during the voyage. Nineteen officers and men of the New South Wales Corps provided the guards. On her arrival at Port Jackson the ship required repairs.

After he had delivered his convicts, Weatherhead took Matilda whaling in the New South Wales fishery or off Van Diemen's Land.

New South Wales records show Matilda as leaving for India in November. She apparently sailed via the Marquesas Islands. Other records have Matilda leaving Port Jackson on 28 December, bound for Peru.

Loss

Matilda was wrecked on 25 February 1792 on a shoal, later named Matilda Island. The crew were saved and returned to Tahiti on 5 March 1792.

The survivors, 21 crew members and one convict stowaway, were later rescued. Six (James O'Connor, James Butcher, John Williams, William Yaty, Andrew Cornelius Lind and Samuel Pollend) refused to return, and chose to settle in Tahiti.

Notes

Citations

References
 
 
 
 
 
 
 
 
 

External links
 
 

1779 ships
Ships of the Third Fleet
Maritime incidents in 1792
Age of Sail merchant ships
Merchant ships of the United Kingdom